Stenoloba solaris is a moth of the family Noctuidae. It is found in China (Yunnan)

The wingspan is about 34 mm. The ground colour of the forewings is lettuce green with a dark-grey area medially. The wing pattern is well marked with well-developed cross-lines. The hindwings are grey with a dark grey discal spot and heavy black terminal line.

Etymology
The species name refers to the orange circular patch at the reniform stigma resembling the rising sun.

References

Moths described in 2013
Bryophilinae